Perdita meconis, the Mojave poppy bee, was first observed by Terry Griswold. His descriptions of the Mojave poppy bee were first published in 1993 in the Pan-Pacific Entomologist alongside two other new bee species. The Mojave poppy bee is a part of the genus Perdita and is a subspecies of Perdita (Phygoperdita) californica native to the Mojave Desert and can be distinguished from other related species by the structure of their tergum. The Mojave poppy bee has, like other Perdita species, a mutualistic relationship with a couple poppy species in their native range, the Las Vegas bear poppy and the dwarf bear-poppy. This relationship is in part how they got their name as the latin word for poppy is "mecon". The Mojave poppy bee has been petitioned for protection under the Endangered Species Act because due to pressures in their native range. These pressures include invasive species, habitat fragmentation, gypsum mining, and climate change.

Description

Males 
Male Mojave poppy bees are relatively small with a body length of 5 millimeters and 4 millimeter forewings. The males have a dark green head that is wider than it is long, with light yellow mandibles, and face (below the antennae). They have mostly black legs with light yellow around the leg joints and stripes on the front of their lower legs. Furthermore, the tergum (the exterior plates that cover the abdomen, which resides below the thorax) of Mojave poppy bees have several distinct characteristics including a dark green to brown region on T1 (closest to the thorax), T2 features a yellow stripe with dark brown spots, T3 is similar with less definition in the spots, T4 is amber in color with slightly lighter spots that lack definition, T5-7 are amber. T7 (furthest from the thorax) has a unique shape featuring a thickened apical that can be viewed from the back of the bee.

Females 
Female Mojave poppy bees are difficult to distinguish from other Perdita,  a trait shared by a few Perdita species. Female Mojave poppy bees are slightly larger than their male counterparts with a body length of 6.5-7 millimeters and 4.5-5 millimeter forewings. Their heads share the same color scheme as the male Mojave poppy bees, however the pale yellow is less present. Their legs are dark brown with light yellow colorings on their front legs. Their tergum is colored differently than the males with T1 and T2 having a dark brown color with a green caste and a basal stripe. T3 and T4 are similar with wider basal stripes. T5 is yellow except for a defined spot.

Habitat

Range 
The Mojave poppy bee's former range included the southwest corner of Utah, northwest region of Arizona and the Southern region of Nevada (around Las Vegas). Now there is no evidence that the Mojave poppy bee remains in Utah. It is presumed that the colonies that inhabited the area around St George have died out. Some evidence suggests one of the reasons that the Mojave poppy bee was pushed to extinction in Utah could be due to the invasion of Africanized honey bees. The current range has been reduced to seven known, highly fragmented, sites in Nevada. There was only ever one recorded instance of this bee in Arizona and this known region is devoid of colonies at this time. For this reason the U.S. Fish & Wildlife Service considers the possible range of the Mojave poppy bee to be limited to Nevada.

Poppies 
The Mojave poppy bee does not switch flowers, meaning its range is limited to where their preferred poppies grow, and where adequate nesting substrate is available. The Mojave poppy bee lives in the gypsum substrate in which their preferred poppies, the dwarf bear-poppy and Las Vegas bear-poppy, grows. Both of these poppies are members of the Arctomecon genus. The dwarf bear-poppy has been listed as an endangered species since 1979 and remains listed on the endangered species list today. The Las Vegas bear-poppy has been submitted for protection under the endangered species act. This petition for protection is currently under review.

Environmental stress

Invasive species 
As noted prior, there is evidence that the introduction of the invasive Africanized honey bees pushed the Mojave poppy bee to extinction in Utah. Africanized bees continue to threaten the  remaining Mojave poppy bee colonies as  they continue to invade the regions where  the Mojave poppy bee still survives. It is thought that the reason that the Mojave poppy bee has withstood the invasion of Africanized bees in Arizona and Nevada is due to a difference in livestock grazing practices between Utah and the other colony locations. 

Invasive species are the second largest threat to biodiversity in the world, in part because invasive species can take over unique ecological niches. Africanized bees have thus far filled the niche of the Mojave poppy bee in Utah, pollinating the bear-poppies. This indicates that the continued proliferation of the highly successful Africanized honey bees in Mojave poppy bee habitat remains a threat to the protection of this rare and indigenous species.

Habitat fragmentation and loss of gene flow 
One of the major threats to the Mojave poppy bee is habitat fragmentation which can be caused by urbanization of previously wild landscapes. Urbanization in the Mojave poppy bee's habitat is due to the construction of new urban environments happening extremely quickly. Quick urbanization can result in habitat fragmentation and because of the poppy bee's small flying radius, the bees become isolated and cannot facilitate geneflow between the smaller metapopulations. It is thought that the smaller isolated populations could have been a much larger more connected metapopulation that  has now been isolated. A lack of gene flow causes an accumulation of deleterious alleles that reduce fitness. If left untreated the accumulation of deleterious alleles and inbreeding could result in homozygosity and inbreeding depression.

Dwindling of poppies and gypsum mining 
The aforementioned dwindling of the Mojave poppy bee's preferred poppies has only been more pronounced with the urbanization of the bee's habitat because the new efforts to urbanize the desert landscape involves uprooting the plants to facilitate urban expansion. However, another threat of the poppies and the Mojave poppy bee is gypsum mining. There are three gypsum mines in the bees' range that dig up the gypsum substrate that the poppies grow in and that the bees nest in. The Bureau of Land Management approved expansion of gypsum mining in 2018 despite the endangered status of the poppy species and the importance of this habitat for the Mojave poppy bee.

Climate change 
Climate change has placed stress on the bear-poppies' life cycle and the Mojave poppy bee's life cycle causing a disconnect between flowering times and active periods in colonies.

Endangered Species Act

Application 
In 2018 an application for the Mojave poppy bee to be protected under the Endangered Species Act was penned and submitted. The petition cited Gypsum mining, urbanization, habitat fragmentation, climate change, invasive species, and disease/predation as exigence for protection. The petition also called for the remaining poppy bee habitat to be designated a critical habitat that needs to be protected for the continued survival of the Mojave poppy bee.

Current status 
The application was placed under consideration in 2019 by the Environmental Protection Agency, however they have yet to make a decision to accept or reject the protection of the Mojave poppy bee or their habitat. Despite the delay in the verdict under the Endangered Species Act there is a general consensus that Perdita meconis is vulnerable to or under threat of extinction.

Important note 
The map of the Africanized bee spread from 2005 is inaccurate as there has been evidence that the Africanized honey bees were present in the southwestern corner of Utah prior to 2005 and is in part why the Mojave poppy bee is extinct in this region.

All images are open source and retrieved via Wikimedia-commons.

See also 
 list of Perdita species

References 

Andrenidae
Insects described in 1993